Portaria nº 344/1998 is the Brazilian Controlled Drugs and Substances Act (Portuguese: Regulamento Técnico sobre substâncias e medicamentos sujeitos a controle especial), Brazil's federal drug control statute, issued by the Brazilian Ministry of Health through its National Health Surveillance Agency (equivalent to the USA's FDA). The "Portaria" also serves as the implementing legislation for the Single Convention on Narcotic Drugs, the Convention on Psychotropic Substances, and the United Nations Convention Against Illicit Traffic in Narcotic Drugs and Psychotropic Substances.

Overview

Class A1 
 ACETILMETADOL
 ACETORFIN
 ALFACETILMETADOL
 ALFAMEPRODINA
 ALFAMETADOL
 ALFAPRODINE
 ALFENTANILA
 ALILPRODINA
 ANILERIDINE
 BENZETTIDINE
 BENZYLMORPHINE
 BENZOYLMORPHINE
 BETACETILMETADOL
 BETAMEPRODINA
 BETAMETADOL
 BETAPRODINE
 BECITRAMIDA
 BUPRENORFINE
 BUTORPHANOL
 CETOBEMIDONE
 CLONITAZENO
 CODOXIMA
 SLEEPING STRAW CONCENTRATE 
 DEXTROMORAMIDA
 DIAMPROMIDA
 DIETILTIAMBUTENO
 DIFENOXYLATE
 DIFENOXIN
 DIYROMORPHINE
 DIMEFEPTANOL (METADOL)
 DIMENOXADOL
 DIMETHYLTHAMBUTENE
 DIOXAFETILA
 DIPHENANONE
 DROTEBANOL
 ETHYLMETHYLTHYLAMBUTENE
 ETONITAZENO
 ETORFINE
 ETOXERIDINE
 PHENADOXONE
 FENAMPROMIDA
 FENAZOCIN
 FENOMORPHANO
 PHENOPERIDINE
 FENTANILA
 FURETTIDINE
 HYDROCODONE
 HYDROMORFINOL
 HYDROMORPHONE
 HYDROXYPHYDIN
 ISOMETHADONE
 LEVOFENACILMORFANO
 LEVOMETORFANO
 LEVOMORAMIDA
 LEVORFANOL
 METADONE
 METHAZININE
 METHYLDESORPHINE
 METHYLDIIDROMORPHINE
 METOPONE
 MIROFIN
 MORFERIDINE
 MORPHINE
 MORINAMIDA
 NICOMORPHINE
 NORACIMETADOL
 NORLEVORFANOL
 NORMETADONE
 NORMORPHINE
 NORPIPANONE
 N-OXYCODEIN
 OPIUM
 OXICODONE
 N-OXIMORPHINE
 PETIDINA
 PIMINODINA
 PIRITRAMIDA
 PROEPTAZINE
 PROPERIDINA
 RACEMETORFANO
 RACEMORAMIDA
 RACEMORPHANO
 REMIFENTANILA
 SUFENTANILA
 TEBACONE (ACETILDIIDROCODEINONE)
 THEBAINE
 TILIDINE
 TRIMEPERIDINE

Class A2 
 ACETYLEDIDOCOCHTYINE
 CODEINE
 DEXTROPROPOXYPHENE
 DIODROCODEINE
 ETHYLMORPHINE (DIONINE)
 FOLCODINA
 NALBUFINA
 NALORPHINE
 NICOCODINE
 NICODICODINE
 NORCODEIN
 PROPER
 TRAMADOL

Class A3 
 AMPHETAMINE
 CATINA
 CLOBENZOREX
 CHLORFENTERINE
 DEXANFETAMIN
 FENCICLIDINE
 PHENETHYL
 PHENMETRAZINE
 LEVANETHETAMINE
 LEVOMETHANETHAMINE
 METHANETHAMINE
 METHYLPHENIDATE
 TANFETAMINE

Class B1 
 ALOBARBITAL
 ALPRAZOLAM
 AMBARBITAL
 APPROBARBITAL
 BARBEXACLONE
 BARBITAL
 BROMAZEPAM
 BROTIZOLAM
 BUTALBITAL
 BUTOBARBITAL
 CAMAZEPAM
 CETAZOLAM
 CICLOBARBITAL
 CLOBAZAM
 CLONAZEPAM
 CHLORAZEPAM
 CHLORAZEPATE
 CLANDIAZEPOXIDE
 CLOTIAZEPAM
 CLOXAZOLAM
 DELORAZEPAM
 DIAZEPAM
 ESTAZOLAM
 ETCLORVINOL
 ETINAMATO
 FENDIMETRAZINE
 FENOBARBITAL
 FLUDIAZEPAM
 FLUNITRAZEPAM
 FLURAZEPAM
 GLUTETIMIDE
 HALAZEPAM
 HALOXAZOLAM
 LEFETAMINE
 LOFLAZEPATO ETILA
 LOPRAZOLAM
 LORAZEPAM
 LORMETAZEPAM
 MEDAZEPAM
 MEPROBAMATE
 MESOCARBO
 PHENOBARBITAL METHYL (PROMINAL)
 METIPRILONE
 MIDAZOLAM
 N-ETHYLPHETAMINE
 NIMETAZEPAM
 NITRAZEPAM
 NORCANFAN (FENCANFAMINE) 
 NORDAZEPAM
 OXAZEPAM
 OXAZOLAM
 PEMOLINA
 PENTAZONINE
 PENTOBARBITAL
 PINAZEPAM
 PIPRADOL
 PIROVARELONA
 PRAZEPAM
 PROLINTANO
 PROPILEXEDRINE
 SECBUTABARBITAL
 SECOBARBITAL
 TEMAZEPAM
 TETRAZEPAM
 TIAMILAL
 TIOPENTAL
 TRIAZOLAM
 TRIEXIFENIDIL
 VINILBITAL
 ZOLPIDEM
 ZOPICLONA

Class B2 
1. AMINOREX

2. ANFEPRAMONE (DIETILPROPIONA)

3. FEMPROPOREX

4. FENDIMETRAZINE

5. FENTERMIN

6. MAZINDOL

7. MEFENOREX

Class C1 
1. ACEPROMAZINE

2. VALPHORIC ACID

3. AMANTADINE

4. AMINEPTINE

5. AMISSULPRIDA

6. AMITRIPTILINE

7. AMOXAPINE

8. AZACICLONOL

9. BECLAMIDE

10. BENACTIZIN

11. BENFLUOREX

12. BENZOCTAMINE

13. BENZOQUINAMIDE

14. BIPERIDENE

15. BUSPIRONE

16. BUTAPERAZINE

17. BUTRIPTILINE

18. CAPTODIAMINE

19. CARBAMAZEPINE

20. CAROXAZONE

21. CETAMINE

22. CYCLARBAMATE

23. CICLEXEDRINE

24. CYCLOPENTOLATE

25. CITALOPRAM

26. CLOMACRANE

27. CLOMETIAZOLE

28. CLOMIPRAMINE

29. CLOREXADOL

30. CLORPROMAZINE

31. CHLOROPROXENE

32. CLOTIAPINE

33. CLOZAPINE

34. DEANOL

35. DESFLURANO

36. DESIPRAMINE

37. DEXETIMIDA

38. DEXFENFLURAMINE

39. DEXTROMETORFANO

40. DIBENZEPINE

41. DIMETRACRIN

42. DISOPIRAMIDE

43. DISSULFIRAM

44. SODIUM DIVALPROATE

45. DIXIRAZINE

46. DOXEPINE

47. DROPERIDOL

48. EMILCAMATO

49. ENFLURANO

50. ETOMIDATE

51. ETOSSUXIMIDA

52. ECTILURÉIA

53. FACETOPERANE (LEVOFACETOPERANE) 

54. FENAGLICODOL

55. FENELZINA

56. FENFLURAMINE

57. Phenytoin

58. PHENYLPROPANOLAMINE

59. FENIPRAZINE

60. FEMPROBAMATO

61. FLUFENAZINE

62. FLUMAZENIL

63. FLUOXETINE

64. FLUPENTIXOL

65. FLUVOXAMINE

66. HALOPERIDOL

67. HALOTAN

68. CLORAL HYDRATE

69. HYDROCHLORBEZETILAMINE

70. HYDROXIDINE

71. HOMOPHENAZINE

72. IMICLOPRAZINE

73. IMIPRAMINE

74. IMIPRAMINOXIDE

75. IPROCLORIZIDA

76. ISOCARBOXAZIDE

77. ISOFLURANE

78. ISOPROPYL-CROTONYL-URINE

79. LAMOTRIGINE

80. LEVODOPA

81. LEVOMEPROMAZINE

82. LINDANO

83. LISURIDA

84. LITHIUM

85. LOPERAMIDA

86. LOXAPINA

87. MAPROTILINE

88. MECLOFENOXATE

89. MEFENOXALONE

90. MEFEXAMIDE

91. MEPAZINE

92. MESORIDAZINE

93. METHYLPENTINOL

94. METISERGIDA

95. METIXENE

96. METOPROMAZINE

97. METOXIFLURANE

98. MIANSERINA

99. MINACIPRAN

100. MINAPRINE 

101. MIRTAZAPINE 

102. MISOPROSTOL 

103. MOCLOBEMIDA 

104. MOPERONE

105. NALOXONE 

106. NALTREXONE 

107. NEFAZODONE

108. NYLAMIDE 

109. NOMIFENSINE 

110. NORTRIPTILINE 

111. NOXPTILINE

112. OLANZAPINE 

113. OPIPRAMOL

114. ORLISTAT 

115. XCARBAZEPINE 

116. OXIFENAMATE

117. OXIPERTINA

118. PAROXETINE 

119. PENFLURIDOL 

120. PERFENAZINE

121. PERGOLIDA

122. PERICIAZIN (PROPERTY) 

123. PIMOZIDA

124. PIPAMPERONE 

125. PIPOTIAZINE 

126. PRAMIDEXOL 

127. PRIMIDONE 

128. PROCLORPERAZINE 

129. PROPANIDINE 

131. PROPIOMAZINE 

132. PROPOFOL 

133. PROTIPENDIL 

134. PROTRIPTILINE 

135. PROXIMETACAINE 

136. RISPERIDONE 

137. ROPINIROL 

138. SELEGILINE 

139. SERTRALINE 

140. SEVOLFURAN 

141. SIBUTRAMINE

142. SILDENAFILA 

143. SULPYRIDE 

144. TACRINE 

145. TALCAPONE 

146. TETRACAINE 

147. TIANEPTINE 

148. TIAPRIDA 

149. TIOPROPERAZINE 

150. TIORIDAZINE 

151. THETIXENE 

152. TOPIRAMATO 

153. TRANILCIPROMINA 

154. TRAZODONA 

155. TRICLOFÓS 

156. TRICLORETILENO 

157. TRIFLUOPERAZINA 

158. TRIFLUPERIDOL 

159. TRIMIPRAMINE 

160. VALPROATO SÓDICO 

161. VENLAFAXINA 

162. VERALIPRIDA 

163. VIGABATRINA 

164. ZIPRAZIDONA 

165. ZUCLOPENTIXOL

Class C2 
1. ACITRETINE

2. ADAPALENO

3. ISOTRETINOIN

4. TRETINOINE

Class C3 
 THALIDOMIDE

Class C4 
1. DELAVIDINE

2. DIDANOSINE (ddI)

3. EFAVIRENZ

4. ESTAVUDINE (d4T)

5. INDINAVIR

6. LAMIVUDINE (3TC)

7. NELFINAVIR

8. NEVIRAPINE

9. RITONAVIR

10. SAQUINAVIR

11. ZALCITABINE (ddC)

12. ZIDOVUDINE (AZT)

Class C5 
1. DIODROEPIANDROSTERONE (DHEA)

2. ESTANOZOLOL

3. FLUOXIMESTERONE OR FLUOXIMETHYLTESTOSTERONE

4. MESTEROLONE

5. METANDRIOL

6. METHYLTESTOSTERONE

7. NANDROLONE

8. OXIMETHOLONE

Class D

Class D1 
 1-PHENYL-2-PROPANONE
 3,4-METHYLENEXYPHENYL-2-PROPANONE
 ANTHRANILIC ACID 
 Phenylacetic acid
 Lysergic acid
 N-ACETYLANANTRANYLIC ACID
 EFEDRINA
 ERGOMETRIN
 ERGOTAMINE
 ISOSAFROL
 PIPERIDINE
 PIPERONAL
 PSEUDOEPHEDRINE
 SAFROL

Class D2 
 ACETONA
 ÁCIDO CLORÍDRICO
 ÁCIDO SULFÚRICO
 ANIDRIDO ACÉTICO
 CLORETO DE METILENO
 CLOROFÓRMIO
 ÉTER ETÍLICO
 METIL ETIL CETONA
 PERMANGANATO DE POTÁSSIO
 SULFATO DE SÓDIO
 TOLUENO

Class E 
1. CANNABIS SATIVUM

2. CLAVICEPS PASPALI

3. DATA SUAVEOLANS

4. ERYTROXYLUM COCA

5. LOPHOPHORA WILLIAMSII (COTO PEYOTE)

6. AMAZONIAN PRESTONIA (HAEMADICTYON AMAZONICUM)

Class F

Class F1 
1. 3-METHYLPENTANILA (N- (3-METHYL-1- (PHENETHYL-4-PIPERIDYL) PROPIONANYLID)

2. 3-METHYLTHYOPENTANILA (N- [3-METHYL-1- [2- (2-THYENYL) ETHYL] -4-PIPERIDYL] PROPIONANYLID)

3. ACETYL-ALPHA-METHYLPENTANILA (N- [1-α-METHYLPHENETHYL) -4-PIPERIDYL] ACETHANYLID)

4. ALPHA-METHYLPENTANILA (N- [1-α-METHYLPHENETHYL) -4-PIPERIDYL] PROPIONANYLID)

5. ALPHYMPHYLTHYLPENTYLENE (N- [1- [1-METHYL-2- (2-THIENYL) ETHYL] -4-PIPERIDYL] PROPIONANYLID)

6. BETA-HYDROXY-3-METHYLPHENANYL

7. BETA-HYDROXIFENTANILA

8. COCAINE

9. DESOMORFINE (DIYRODEOXIMORFINE)

10. ECGONINE

11. HEROIN (DIACEHYLMORPHINE)

12. MPPP (PIPERIDINE (1-METHYL-4-PHENYL-4-PROPIONATE)

13. PARA-FLUOROFENTANILA (4-FLUORO-N- (1-PHENETHYL-4-PIPERIDYL) PROPIONANYLID)

14. PEPAP (PIPERIDINE (1-PHENETHYL-4-PHENYL-4-ACETATE)

15. THIOFENTANILA (N- [1- [2-TIENYL) ETHYL] -4-PIPERIDYL] PROPIONANYLIDE)

Class F2 
1. 4-METHYLAMINOREX (±) -CIS-2-AMINO-4-METHYL-5-PHENYL-2-OXAZOLINE

2. BENZOPHETAMINE

3. CATINONE ((-) - (5) -2-AMINOPROPYOPHENONE)

4. ETHYL CHLORIDE

5. DET (3- [2- (DIETILAMINO) ETHYL] LINDOL)

6. LYSERGIDA (9,10-DIDEHYDRO-N, N-DIETYL-6-METHYLERGOLINE-8β-CARBOXAMIDE) -LSD

7. DMA ((±) -2,5-DIMETHOXY-α-METHYLPHENETHYLAMINE)

8. DMHP (3- (1,2-DIMETHYLETHYLPHYL) -7,8,9,10-TETRAHYDRO-6,6,9-TRIMETHYL-6H-DIBENZO [B, D] PYRANE-1-OL)

9. DMT (3- [2- (DIMETHYLAMINO) ETHYL] INDOL)

10. DOB ((±) -4-BROMO-2,5-DIMETOXY-α-METHYLPHENETHYLAMINE) -BROLANETHETAMINE

11. DOET ((±) -4-ETHYL-2,5-DIMETHOXY-PHENETHYLAMINE)

12. ETHYLICYLIDINE (N-ETHYL-1-PHENYLCYLOHEXYLAMINE) -PCE

13. ETRIPTAMINE (3- (2-AMINOBUTYL) INDOL)

14. MDA (α-METHYL-3,4- (METHYLENEOXY) FENETHYLAMINE) -TAMAMETHETHAMINE

15. MDMA ((±) -N, α-DIMETHYL-3,4- (METHYLENEOXY) FENETHYLAMINE)

16. MECLOQUALONE

17. MESCALINE (3,4,5-TRIMETHOXYPHENETHYLAMINE)

18. METAQUALONE

19. METICATINONE (2- (METHYLAMINO) -1-PHENYLPROPAN-L-ONA)

20. MMDA (2-METHOXY-α-METHYL-4,5- (METHYLENEOXY) FENETHYLLINE)

21. PARAHEXYL (3-HEXYL-7,8,9,10-TETRAHYDRO-6,6,9-TRIMETHYL-6H-DIBENZO [B, D] PYRAN-1-OL)

22. PMA (P-METHOXY-α-METHYLPHENETHYLAMINE)

23. PSYCHOBIIN (DIHYDROGENATE PHOSPHATE 3- [2- (DIMETHYLAMINOETHYL)] INDOL-4-YL)

24. PSYCHOKINE (3- [2- (DIMETHYLAMINO) ETHYL] INDOL-4-OL)

25. ROLYCYCLIDINE (L- (L-PHENYLICYLOMEXYL) PYRROLIDINE) -PHP, PCPY

26. STP, DOM (2,5-DIMETOXY-α, 4-DIMETHYLPHENETHYLAMINE)

27. TENOCYCLIDINE (1- [1- (2-THENYL) CYCLOHEXYL] PIPERIDINE) -TCP

28. THC (TETRAIDROCANABINOL)

29. TMA ((±) -3,4,5-TRIMETHOXY-α-METHYLPHENETHYLAMINE) 30. ZIPEPROL

Class F3 
 STRICHININE
 ETRETINATE

References

Brazilian legislation
Drug control law
Drug policy of Brazil